George Grenville (14 October 1712 – 13 November 1770) was a British Whig statesman who rose to the position of Prime Minister of Great Britain. Grenville was born into an influential political family and first entered Parliament in 1741 as an MP for Buckingham. He emerged as one of Cobham's Cubs, a group of young members of Parliament associated with Lord Cobham.

In 1754 Grenville became Treasurer of the Navy, a position he held twice until 1761. In October 1761 he chose to stay in government and accepted the new role of Leader of the Commons causing a rift with his brother-in-law and political ally William Pitt who had resigned. Grenville was subsequently made Northern Secretary and First Lord of the Admiralty by the new Prime Minister Lord Bute. On 8 April 1763, Lord Bute resigned, and Grenville assumed his position as Prime Minister. His government tried to bring public spending under control and pursued an assertive foreign policy. His best-known policy is the Stamp Act, a long-standing tax in Great Britain which Grenville extended to the colonies in America, but which instigated widespread opposition in Britain's American colonies and was later repealed. Grenville had increasingly strained relations with his colleagues and the King. In 1765, he was dismissed by George III and replaced by Lord Rockingham. For the last five years of his life, Grenville led a group of his supporters in opposition and staged a public reconciliation with Pitt.

Early life
George Grenville was born at Wotton House on 14 October 1712. He was the second son of Richard Grenville and Hester Temple (later the 1st Countess Temple). He was one of five brothers, all of whom became MPs. His sister Hester Grenville married the leading political figure William Pitt. His elder brother was Richard Grenville, later the 2nd Earl Temple. It was intended by his parents that George Grenville should become a lawyer. Grenville was educated at Eton College and at Christ Church, Oxford, and was called to the bar in 1735.

Politics

Loyalist

He entered Parliament in 1741 as one of the two members for Buckingham, and continued to represent that borough for the next twenty-nine years until his death. He was disappointed to be giving up what appeared to be a promising legal career for the uncertainties of opposition politics.

In Parliament, he subscribed to the "Boy Patriot" party, which opposed Sir Robert Walpole. In particular he enjoyed the patronage of Lord Cobham, the leader of a faction that included George Grenville, his brother Richard, William Pitt and George Lyttelton that became known as Cobham's Cubs.

Joins Administration
In December 1744 he became a Lord of the Admiralty in the administration of Henry Pelham. He allied himself with his brother Richard and with William Pitt (who became their brother-in-law in 1754) in forcing Pelham to give them promotion by rebelling against his authority and obstructing business. In June 1747, Grenville became a Lord of the Treasury.

In 1754 Grenville was made Treasurer of the Navy and Privy Councillor. Along with Pitt and several other colleagues he was dismissed in 1755 after speaking and voting against the government on a debate about a recent subsidy treaty with Russia which they believed was unnecessarily costly, and would drag Britain into Continental European disputes. Opposition to European entanglements was a cornerstone of Patriot Whig thinking.

He and Pitt joined the opposition, haranguing the Newcastle government. Grenville and Pitt both championed the formation of a British militia to provide additional security rather than the deployment of Hessian mercenaries favoured by the government. As the military situation deteriorated following the loss of Minorca, the government grew increasingly weak until it was forced to resign in Autumn 1756.

In Government with Pitt

Treasurer of the Navy
Pitt then formed a government led by the Duke of Devonshire. Grenville was returned to his position as Treasurer of the Navy, which was a great disappointment as he had been expecting to receive the more prestigious and lucrative post of Paymaster of the Forces. This added to what Grenville regarded as a series of earlier slights in which Pitt and others had passed him over for positions in favour of men he considered no more talented than he was. From then on Grenville felt a growing resentment towards Pitt, and grew closer to the young Prince of Wales and his advisor Lord Bute who were both now opposed to Pitt.

In 1758, as Treasurer of the Navy, he introduced and carried a bill which established a fairer system of paying the wages of seamen and supporting their families while they were at sea which was praised for its humanity if not for its effectiveness. He remained in office during the years of British victories, notably the Annus Mirabilis of 1759 for which the credit went to the government of which he was a member. However his seven-year-old son died after a long illness and Grenville remained by his side at their country house in Wotton and rarely came to London.

In 1761, when Pitt resigned upon the question of the war with Spain, and subsequently functioned as Leader of the House of Commons in the administration of Lord Bute. Grenville's role was seen as an attempt to keep someone closely associated with Pitt involved in the government, in order to prevent Pitt and his supporters actively opposing the government. However, it soon led to conflict between Grenville and Pitt. Grenville was also seen as a suitable candidate because his reputation for honesty meant he commanded loyalty and respect amongst independent MPs.

Northern Secretary

In May 1762, Grenville was appointed Northern Secretary, where he took an increasingly hard line in the negotiations with France and Spain designed to bring the Seven Years' War to a close.

Grenville demanded much greater compensation in exchange for the return of British conquests, while Bute favored a more generous position which eventually formed the basis of the Treaty of Paris. In spite of this, Grenville had now become associated with Bute rather than his former political allies who were even more vocal in their opposition to the peace treaty than he was. In October he was made First Lord of the Admiralty. Henry Fox took over as Leader of the Commons, and forced the peace treaty through parliament.

Bute's position grew increasingly untenable as he was extremely unpopular, which led to him offering his resignation to George III on several occasions. With reluctance George III eventually accepted Bute's resignation and accepted that Grenville should be his successor, in spite of his personal dislike of him. In April 1763, Grenville became First Lord of the Treasury and Chancellor of the Exchequer succeeding Bute as first Minister after Henry Fox had rejected the job.

Prime minister

Grenville's first act was to prosecute John Wilkes for publishing in The North Briton newspaper an article deriding King George III's speech made on 23 April 1763. Wilkes was prosecuted for "seditious libel" and, after a duel with a Grenville supporter Samuel Martin, fled to France. Wilkes was later elected and re-elected by the Middlesex constituency. He was continually refused admission to parliament by parliament, and proved a problem to several successive governments.

As Britain was trying to recover from the costs of the Seven Years' War and now in dire need of finances for the British army in the American colonies, Grenville's most immediate task was to restore the nation's finances. He also had to deal with the fall-out from Pontiac's Rebellion, which erupted in North America in 1763. Prominent measures of his administration included the prosecution of John Wilkes and the passing of the American Stamp Act 1765, which led to the first symptoms of alienation between American colonies and Great Britain.

Stamp Act

One of the more prominent measures of Grenville's administration occurred in March 1765 when Grenville authored the Stamp Act, enacted in November of that year. It was an exclusive tax placed on the colonies in America requiring that documents and newspapers be printed on stamped paper from London bearing an embossed revenue stamp that had to be paid for in British currency. It was met with general outrage and resulted in public acts of disobedience and rioting throughout the colonies in America.

Foreign policy
In disputes with Spain and France, Grenville managed to secure British objectives by deploying what was later described as gunboat diplomacy. During his administration Britain's international isolation increased, as Britain failed to secure alliances with other major European powers, a situation that subsequent governments were unable to reverse leading to Britain fighting several countries during the American War of Independence without a major ally.

Dismissal
The King made various attempts to induce Pitt to come to his rescue by forming a ministry, but without success, and at last had recourse to Lord Rockingham. When Rockingham agreed to accept office, the king dismissed Grenville in July 1765. He never again held office.

The nickname of "gentle shepherd" was given him because he bored the House by asking over and over again, during the debate on the Cider Bill of 1763, that somebody should tell him "where" to lay the new tax if it was not to be put on cider. Pitt whistled the air of the popular tune (by Boyce) Gentle Shepherd, tell me where, and the House laughed. Though few surpassed him in knowledge of the forms of the House or in mastery of administrative details, he lacked tact in dealing with people and affairs.

Later career
After a period of active opposition to the Chatham Ministry led by Pitt between 1766 and 1768, Grenville became an elder statesman during his last few years – seeking to avoid becoming associated with any faction or party in the House of Commons. He was able to oversee the re-election of his core group of supporters in the 1768 General Election. His followers included Robert Clive and Lord George Sackville and he received support from his elder brother Lord Temple.

In late 1768 he reconciled with Pitt and the two joined forces, re-uniting the partnership that had broken up in 1761 when Pitt had resigned from the government. Grenville was successful in mobilising the opposition during the Middlesex election dispute.

Grenville prosecuted John Wilkes and the printers and authors for treason and sedition for publishing a bitter editorial about King George III's recent speech in "The North Briton" a weekly periodical. After losing the case Grenville lost favor from the public who regarded the act as an attempt to silence or control the press.

Although personally opposed to Wilkes, Grenville saw the government's attempt to bar him from the Commons as unconstitutional and opposed it on principle.

Following a French invasion of Corsica in 1768 Grenville advocated sending British support to the Corsican Republic. Grenville was critical of the Grafton Government's failure to intervene and he considered such weakness would encourage the French. In the House of Commons he observed "For fear of going to war, you will make a war unavoidable".

In 1770 Grenville steered a bill concerning the results of contested elections, a major issue in the eighteenth century, into law – despite strong opposition from the government.

Grenville died on 13 November 1770, aged 58. His personal following divided after his death, with a number joining the government of Lord North. In the long-term, the Grenvillites were revived by William Pitt the Younger who served as Prime Minister from 1784 and dominated British politics until his death in 1806. Grenville's own son, William Grenville, later served briefly as Prime Minister. Grenville is buried at Wotton Underwood in Buckinghamshire

George Grenville's post mortem was carried up by John Hunter who retained specimens in his collection which later became the Hunterian Museum. Subsequent analysis of these specimens published by the Royal College of Surgeons of England suggests that George Grenville was affected by Multiple myeloma at the time of his death.

Legacy
He was one of the relatively few prime ministers (others include Henry Pelham, William Pitt the Younger, Henry Campbell-Bannerman, Bonar Law, Ramsay MacDonald, Neville Chamberlain, Sir Winston Churchill, George Canning, Spencer Perceval, William Ewart Gladstone, Edward Heath, John Major, Tony Blair, Gordon Brown, David Cameron, Theresa May, Boris Johnson, and Liz Truss) who never acceded to the peerage.

The town of Grenville, Quebec, was named after George Grenville. The town is in turn the namesake for the Grenville orogeny, a long-lived Mesoproterozoic mountain-building event associated with the assembly of the supercontinent Rodinia. Its record is a prominent orogenic belt which spans a significant portion of the North American continent, from Labrador to Mexico, and extends to Scotland.

Family life
In 1749 Grenville married Elizabeth Wyndham (1719 – 5 December 1769), daughter of Sir William Wyndham, and the granddaughter of the Duke of Somerset. Somerset did not approve of their marriage and consequently left Elizabeth only a small sum in his will.

The couple had four sons and four daughters. (One account states they had five daughters.)

 Richard Grenville (died 1759), died young
 George Nugent-Temple-Grenville, 1st Marquess of Buckingham (17 June 1753 – 11 February 1813), father of the 1st Duke of Buckingham and Chandos
 Charlotte Grenville ( – 29 September 1830), married Sir Watkin Williams-Wynn, 4th Baronet (1749–1789) on 21 December 1771, and had eight children, six of whom survived to adulthood
 Thomas Grenville (31 December 1755 – 17 December 1846), MP and bibliophile, died unmarried
 Elizabeth Grenville (24 October 1756 – 21 December 1842), married (as his second wife) John Proby, 1st Earl of Carysfort (1751–1828), on 12 April 1787, and had three daughters
 William Grenville, 1st Baron Grenville (25 October 1759 – 12 January 1834), later Prime Minister
 Catherine Grenville (1761 – 6 November 1796), married Richard Neville-Aldworth (1750–1825), afterwards Richard Griffin, 2nd Baron Braybrooke, on 19 June 1780, and had four children.
 Hester Grenville (before 1767 – 13 November 1847), married Hugh Fortescue, 1st Earl Fortescue, on 10 May 1782 and had nine children

At the time of his death in 1770, he was the heir presumptive to the Earldom of Temple held by his elder brother Richard (who had succeeded their mother in that title in 1752, but had no sons). When Richard died in 1779, George's second (but eldest surviving) son, also George, therefore succeeded as 3rd Earl Temple, and was later created Marquess of Buckingham. His male line survived until the death of the 3rd Duke of Buckingham and Chandos in 1889.

See also
 Grenvillite

References

Attribution

Bibliography
 
 
 
 ; cited as GrenODNB.
 
 
 
 
 Leonard, Dick. "George Grenville — Able Premier, Undermined by His Own Prolixity"  in Dick Leonard, ed. Eighteenth-Century British Premiers (Palgrave Macmillan UK, 2011) pp 92–110

External links

1712 births
1770 deaths
Younger sons of earls
People educated at Eton College
Alumni of Christ Church, Oxford
Prime Ministers of Great Britain
British Secretaries of State
Chancellors of the Exchequer of Great Britain
Lords of the Admiralty
Whig (British political party) MPs for English constituencies
Members of the Privy Council of Great Britain
Members of the Parliament of Great Britain for English constituencies
British MPs 1741–1747
British MPs 1747–1754
British MPs 1754–1761
British MPs 1761–1768
British MPs 1768–1774
18th-century heads of government
George Grenville
Parents of prime ministers of the United Kingdom
Leaders of the House of Commons of Great Britain
Whig members of the Parliament of Great Britain